Lauren Tom (born August 4, 1961) is an American actress. Her roles include Lena St. Clair in The Joy Luck Club, Julie in the NBC sitcom Friends, Dot in the final season of Grace Under Fire, and the voices for Amy Wong in Futurama, Dana Tan in Batman Beyond, Jinx and Gizmo in Teen Titans and Teen Titans Go!, Minh and Connie Souphanousinphone in King of the Hill, and Numbuh 3 in Codename: Kids Next Door. She portrayed Celia Mack in the Disney Channel series Andi Mack and also played Mrs. Tran in the CW series Supernatural.

Early life
Tom was born in the Chicago suburb of Highland Park, Illinois, the daughter of Nancy (née Dare) and Chan Tom, Jr. She has a brother named Chip. Their parents were born in Chicago, and their grandparents came from Kaiping, Guangdong, China.

Raised in Highland Park, she grew up as a Catholic in a largely Jewish neighborhood.

Career

Theatre
At the age of 17, Tom landed a spot with a touring company of A Chorus Line and was cast in the Broadway production of the show less than a year later in the role of Connie. She won an Obie Award for her Off-Broadway acting and was cast in the Broadway shows Hurlyburly and Doonesbury. In Chicago she starred in the Goodman Theater's production of 'Tis Pity She's a Whore.

Film
Tom had several small roles in movies including Nothing Lasts Forever, Wall Street, See No Evil, Hear No Evil, and Blue Steel. Her biggest role up until that point was as a waitress in the Robin Williams/Tim Robbins film Cadillac Man. This role led to being a guest on The Tonight Show Starring Johnny Carson.

Tom landed a lead role in the film The Joy Luck Club in 1993, which led to roles in other films such as When a Man Loves a Woman and North.

Since the mid-1990s, Tom has focused primarily on voiceover roles. She has appeared in a few live-action films, including the 2003 comedy Bad Santa and the critically acclaimed 2004 film In Good Company.

Television
Lauren Tom's first role in television was that of Miko Wakamatsu on The Facts of Life. She subsequently appeared on The Equalizer, Catfish With Black Bean Sauce, thirtysomething, Quantum Leap, Chicago Hope, Homicide: Life on the Street, Grace Under Fire, Friends, The Nanny, The Middle, DAG, The Division, Monk, My Wife and Kids, Barbershop: The Series, Grey's Anatomy, The Closer, and Men in Trees. She also had a supporting role on the 8th and 9th season of the drama series Supernatural as prophet Kevin Tran's mother, Linda Tran. In 2018, she appeared in the second season of the Amazon Prime drama series Goliath.

Voice acting

Tom began vocal work in the animated series Superman: The Animated Series playing Angela Chen. From there on, she voiced Dana Tan in Batman Beyond and had minor roles on Pinky and the Brain, Extreme Ghostbusters, and The Zeta Project before landing her regular roles on King of the Hill, where she voiced Minh and Connie Souphanousinphone and later Futurama, where she voices Amy and Inez Wong.

Since first playing the character on stage in the 1983 Doonesbury musical, Tom has periodically voiced the character Honey Huan in media related to Doonesbury, most notably in a series of animated shorts satirizing the 2000 U.S. presidential election.

She has also lent her voice to All Grown Up!, Rocket Power, Max Steel, Handy Manny as Mrs. Lee and Nelson, Samurai Jack, Johnny Bravo, Justice League Unlimited, Kim Possible, and Legion of Super Heroes.

She has also voiced the villains Gizmo and Jinx on Teen Titans, Yan Lin, Susan, Alchemy on W.I.T.C.H., Tasumi on The Replacements, Jake's mom, Counselor Chang on American Dragon: Jake Long, and as Joo Dee on Avatar: The Last Airbender. She also guest-starred in The Penguins of Madagascar as Chuck Charles's co-anchor, Bonnie Chang, in "Gator Watch" and "All Tied Up With a Boa".

In 2010, she did the voice of Song, Bai Li, and Ming on the animated series, Kung Fu Panda: Legends of Awesomeness and also played the role of Jessica in the animated film, Scooby-Doo! Camp Scare.

Other animated movies Tom has voiced include Mulan II, Kim Possible: The Secret Files, Kim Possible Movie: So The Drama, Kung Fu Panda 2, Batman Beyond: Return of the Joker, and the four Futurama movies: Bender's Big Score, The Beast with a Billion Backs, Bender's Game, and Into the Wild Green Yonder.

She voiced Li Li Stormstout in World of Warcraft: Mists of Pandaria and played Hayaku on an episode of Turbo FAST.

Personal life
Tom was previously married to Glenn Lau-Kee. She has since remarried actor Curt Kaplan in October 1999. Tom and Kaplan have two sons.

Filmography

Film

Television

Video games

Stage

References

External links

 
 
 
 

1961 births
Living people
Actresses from Chicago
Actresses from Los Angeles
American actresses of Chinese descent
American film actresses
American people of Chinese descent
American stage actresses
American television actresses
American video game actresses
American voice actresses
Obie Award recipients
20th-century American actresses
21st-century American actresses